John and Mary is a 1969 American romantic drama film directed by Peter Yates, directly following the success of his film Bullitt. It stars Dustin Hoffman and Mia Farrow in the title roles, directly following their success in Midnight Cowboy and Rosemary's Baby, respectively. The screenplay was adapted by John Mortimer from the 1966 Mervyn Jones novel.

Plot

John and Mary begins the morning after John and Mary meet in a bar, during a conversation about Jean-Luc Godard's Weekend, and go home with each other. The story unfolds during the day as they belatedly get to know each other over breakfast, lunch and dinner. Flashbacks of their previous bad relationships are interspersed throughout when something in their conversation brings the thought up.

Cast

Casting
It was the film debut of Tyne Daly.

Release
The film had its premiere at the Sutton Theatre in New York City on Sunday, December 14, 1969 and opened the following day. It received an R rating upon its original release, which was later downgraded to a PG rating.

Critical reception
Before the release of the film, both Hoffman and Farrow made the cover of Time in February 1969, with the headline "The Young Actors: Stars and Anti-Stars". This marked and celebrated new actors like Hoffman and Farrow (both hot off their successes in The Graduate and Rosemary's Baby respectively) as significant to their generation.

Roger Ebert of the Chicago Sun-Times wrote "John and Mary is supposed to be a contemporary movie, I guess, and yet it's curiously out of touch. John and Mary shadow box uneasily with the American language, trying to sound like all people their age without sounding too much like any particular person." John Thompson of the Orlando Weekly calls it "a delectable New Wave–inspired dish for thoughtful viewers tired of the same old menu." Vincent Canby of The New York Times wrote "There is nothing wrong with the idea of John and Mary, just with its execution."

Rotten Tomatoes reports 5 positive and 6 negative reviews of the film for a score of 45%.

Box office
According to Fox records, the film required $6,300,000 in rentals to break even, and by December 11, 1970, it had made $8,150,000, resulting in a profit to the studio.

Musical score and soundtrack

The film score was composed, arranged and conducted by Quincy Jones and the soundtrack, featuring vocalists Evie Sands, The Strange Things, Jeff Bridges, The Morgan Ames Singers and four classical pieces performed by a brass ensemble, was released on the A&M label in 1970.

Track listing
All compositions by Quincy Jones except where noted
 "Maybe Tomorrow (Vocal)" (Lyrics by Alan and Marilyn Bergman) − 3:10	
 "Bump in the Night" − 1:58	
 "Lost in Space" (Jeff Bridges) − 3:15
 "Silent Movies" − 2:11	
 "Maybe Tomorrow" (Lyrics by Alan and Marilyn Bergman) − 4:18
 "Main Title" − 2:48
 "22nd Fugue for Well-Tempered Clavichord" (Johann Sebastian Bach) − 1:31
 "Rondo No. 1" (Wolfgang Amadeus Mozart) − 1:58	
 "Opus 54, Variations Serieuses" (Felix Mendelssohn) − 2:05
 "Allegro from Royal Fireworks Suite" (George Frideric Handel) − 3:58
 "Maybe Tomorrow" − 3:58

Personnel
 Unidentified orchestra arranged and conducted by Quincy Jones
 Evie Sands (track 1), The Strange Things (track 2), Jeff Bridges (track 3), The Morgan Ames Singers (track 5) − vocals
 The John and Mary Brass Ensemble (tracks 7–11)

Awards

Won:

1970 BAFTA Award, Best Actor – Dustin Hoffman (For Midnight Cowboy and John and Mary)

Nominated:

1970 BAFTA Award, Best Actress – Mia Farrow (For: Rosemary's Baby, Secret Ceremony and John and Mary)
1970 Golden Globes, Best Actor, Musical/Comedy – Dustin Hoffman
1970 Golden Globes, Best Actress, Musical/Comedy – Mia Farrow
1970 Golden Globes, Best Screenplay – John Mortimer 
1970 WGA Awards, Best Adapted Screenplay – John Mortimer

See also
 List of American films of 1969

References

External links 
 
 
 

1969 films
1969 romantic drama films
American romantic drama films
Films based on British novels
Films set in New York City
Films directed by Peter Yates
Films scored by Quincy Jones
20th Century Fox films
1960s English-language films
1960s American films